Henry Dreyfuss (March 2, 1904 – October 5, 1972) was an American industrial design pioneer. Dreyfuss is known for designing some of the most iconic devices found in American homes and offices throughout the twentieth century, including the Western Electric Model 500 telephone, the Westclox Big Ben alarm clock, and the Honeywell round thermostat. Dreyfuss enjoyed long-term associations with several name brand companies such as American Telephone and Telegraph, John Deere, Polaroid, and American Airlines.

Career

Dreyfuss, a native of Brooklyn, New York City, is one of the celebrity industrial designers of the 1930s and 1940s who pioneered his field. Dreyfuss dramatically improved the look, feel, and usability of dozens of consumer products. Sometimes compared to Raymond Loewy and other contemporaries, Dreyfuss was much more than a stylist; he applied common sense and a scientific approach to design problems, making products more pleasing to the eye and hand, safer to use, and more efficient to manufacture and repair. His work helped popularize the role of the industrial designer while also contributing significant advances to the fields of ergonomics, anthropometrics and human factors.

Dreyfuss began as a Broadway theatrical designer. Until 1920, he apprenticed under Norman Bel Geddes, who would later become one of his competitors. In 1929, Dreyfuss opened his own office for theatrical and industrial design. His firm met with commercial success, and continued as Henry Dreyfuss Associates for over four decades after his death.

Designs

Hoover model 150 vacuum cleaner (1936)
 Several Westclox Big Ben alarm clocks (1931–1956). The style 3 (1931), 4 (1934), 5 (1939) and 6 (1949) Big and Baby Ben cases were all designed by Dreyfuss.
New York Central Railroad's streamlined Mercury train, both locomotive and passenger cars (1936)
New York Central Hudson locomotive for the 20th Century Limited (1938)
 Popular Democracity model city of the future at the 1939 New York World's Fair at the Trylon and Perisphere
 Styled John Deere Model A, B, and H tractors (1938)
 Wahl-Eversharp Skyline fountain pen (1940)
Royal Typewriter Company's Quiet DeLuxe (late 1940s)
Bell System telephones: Western Electric 500-series desk and wall telephones (1949 - 1972), Princess telephone (1959), Model 1500 10 digit touchtone (1963), Model 2500 12-digit touchtone (1968–present), and the Trimline telephone (1965–present)
 Two American steamships, SS Independence and SS Constitution for American Export Lines (1951–2)
Honeywell T87 "the Round" circular wall thermostat (1953–present)
 Spherical Hoover model 82 Constellation vacuum cleaner which floated on an air cushion of its own exhaust (1954)
 Hoover model 65 convertible vacuum cleaner (1957)
John Deere 1010, 2010, 3010, and 4010 tractors (1960)
 Bankers Trust Building at 280 Park Avenue in Manhattan, New York City, with Emery Roth & Sons (1963)
American Airlines branding (1960s)
Polaroid SX-70 Land camera (1972)

Later life and death
In 1955, Dreyfuss wrote Designing for People. A window into Dreyfuss's career as an industrial designer, the book illustrated his ethical and aesthetic principles, included design case studies, many anecdotes, and an explanation of his "Joe" and "Josephine" anthropometric charts. 
In 1960 he published The Measure of Man, a collection of ergonomic reference charts providing designers precise specifications for product designs.
In 1965, Dreyfuss became the first President of the Industrial Designers Society of America (IDSA).
In 1969, Dreyfuss retired from the firm he founded, but continued serving many of the companies he worked with as board member and consultant.
In 1972 Dreyfuss published The Symbol Sourcebook, An Authoritative Guide to International Graphic Symbols. This visual database of over 20,000 symbols continues to provide a standard for industrial designers around the world.

On October 5, 1972, the bodies of Henry Dreyfuss (aged 68) and his wife and business partner Doris Marks Dreyfuss (aged 69) were found dead in the garage at 500 Columbia Street in South Pasadena, California by Dr. Edward Evans, the family physician. They committed suicide together. Authorities reported the cause of death as carbon monoxide poisoning. Lieut. John R. Simmons, chief of the detective bureau of the South Pasadena police, reported that notes had been left. A note instructed the Dreyfuss's maid to call Dr. Evans upon her arrival this morning. Another note held the key to the carriage house and instructions to enter. Dr. Evans reported the deaths to the police at approximately 8:10 A.M. The couple was survived by their son, John A., and their two daughters, Ann and Mrs. George C. Wilson Jr.. Mrs. Dreyfuss was terminally ill at this time.

References

Bibliography
Dreyfuss, Henry. Symbol Sourcebook: An Authoritative Guide to International Graphic Symbols. New York: John Wiley & Sons. 1984. 
Dreyfuss, Henry. Designing for People. Allworth Press; illustrated edition, 2003. 
Flinchum, Russell. Henry Dreyfuss, Industrial Designer: The Man in the Brown Suit. Rizzoli, 1997. 
Innes, Christopher. Designing Modern America: Broadway to Main Street. Yale University Press, 2005.

External links

 Video on Dreyfuss's design for Honeywell thermostat and for his Bell Telephone, at Wikimedia Commons

1904 births
1972 suicides
People from Brooklyn
American industrial designers
Suicides by carbon monoxide poisoning
Suicides in California
Joint suicides
1972 deaths